Yên Lập is a rural district of Phú Thọ province in the Northeast region of Vietnam. As of 2003 the district had a population of 79,548. The district covers an area of 437 km². The district capital lies at Yên Lập.

Administrative divisions
The district consists of the district capital, Yên Lập, and 16 communes: Mỹ Lung, Mỹ Lương, Lương Sơn, Xuân An, Xuân Viên, Xuân Thủy, Hưng Long, Thượng Long, Nga Hoàng, Trung Sơn, Đồng Thịnh, Phúc Khánh, Ngọc Lập, Ngọc Đồng, Minh Hòa and Đồng Lạc.

References

Districts of Phú Thọ province